Amelia Green (born 13 September 1991) is an Antigua and Barbuda footballer who plays as a defender and the Antigua and Barbuda women's national team.

External links 
 

1991 births
Living people
Antigua and Barbuda women's footballers
Women's association football defenders
Antigua and Barbuda women's international footballers